Kubo Shunman ( – 26 October 1820) was a Japanese artist and writer.  He produced ukiyo-e prints and paintings, gesaku novels, and kyōka and haiku poetry.

Life and career

Shunman was born in about 1757 (Hōreki 7 on the Japanese calendar) with the surname of either Kubo or Kubota and the given name Yasubei ( or ).  He was orphaned while young.  He studied under , a poet, kokugaku scholar, and painter in the style of the Chinese Shen Quan.  He later also studied under the ukiyo-e artist Kitao Shigemasa.

Upon finishing his apprenticeship took the art name Shunman (first spelt , later ).  Other art names he used include Shōsadō and Sashōdō, both of which use the character 左 sa, meaning "left", as he was left-handed.  Early in his career he published as a gesaku novelist under the names Nandaka Shiran and Kizandō, as a kyōka poet under the name Hitofushi Chitsue, and as a haiku poet under the name.  He had a heightened sense of beauty and devoted himself to the pleasure-seeking world.

Shunman's earliest works dates to 1774: a votive plaque copied from Nahiko.  His works include some ukiyo-e prints, book illustrations, paintings, illustrated novels, and poetry.  He was the most prolific producer of paintings in the Kitao school; more than 70 of his paintings survive.

His bijin-ga portraits of beauties were less in the stately style of his master Shigemasa than in that of the long, slender beauties of Torii Kiyonaga.

Shunman was a member of the poets' clubs Bakuro-ren and Rokujuen, and became head of Bakuro-ren.  He stopped making designing commercial prints in 1790 to focus on deluxe commissioned prints, and provided poetry for the prints of Hokusai, Utamaro, and Eishi.

References

Works cited

External links

18th-century Japanese artists
19th-century Japanese artists
Ukiyo-e artists